The Mane 'n Tail Lady Stallions were a professional volleyball team in the Philippine Super Liga (PSL). It was one of two teams owned by Federated Distributors, Inc. and was the second team to play under the name "Mane 'n Tail Lady Stallions". The original Mane 'n Tail Lady Stallions was renamed Philips Gold Lady Slammers in 2015.

Roster
For the Fit To Hit: Philippine Beach Volleyball Invitational:

Coaching staff
 Head coach:
 Assistant coach(s):

Team Staff
 Team manager:
 Team Utility: 

Medical Staff
 Team physician:
 Physical Therapist:

For the 2015 PSL All-Filipino Conference:

Coaching staff
 Head coach: Rosemarie Prochina
 Assistant coach(s): Zenaida Chavez Philip Coming

Team Staff
 Team manager:
 Team Utility: 

Medical Staff
 Team physician:
 Physical Therapist: Francisco dela Cruz

Honors

Team
Philippine Superliga

Others

References

Philippine Super Liga
2015 establishments in the Philippines
Volleyball clubs established in 2015